Cole Pauls is a Canadian comic book author, from Haines Junction, Yukon.  He is a member of the Tahltan First Nation, and his Dakwäkãda Warriors series is written in English and Southern Tutchone.

In his interview with High Country News Pauls described how he was inspired to write his comic by his desire to help Native children.

The CBC placed his book on their recommended reading list for the winter of 2020.

References

Canadian comics writers
21st-century First Nations writers
Living people
Tahltan people
Southern Tutchone
Year of birth missing (living people)